Craig Eldon Jepson (born ) is a New Zealand local politician who is the mayor of Kaipara District in New Zealand's Northland Region. During the 2000s, Jepson served as a spokesperson for Olivine NZ's unsuccessful attempt to convert the former coal-powered Meremere Power Station in Gisborne into a waste-to-energy station. Jepson later moved to Mangawhai where he established a concrete business that was involved in local rural and urban development. In October 2022, Jepson was elected mayor of Kaipara. As mayor, Jepson attracted media coverage following his attempt to ban karakia (Māori prayers) from council proceedings, which he subsequently reversed following significant criticism from the public and fellow councillors.

Professional career
During the early 2000s, Jepson spent three years lobbying in favour of Olivine NZ's attempt to convert the former coal-powered Meremere Power Station in Gisborne into a waste-to-energy station. As Olivine's spokesperson, Jepson claimed that the Meremere plant's waste burning technology was cleaner than a rubbish dump and was preferable to exporting toxins overseas. While promoting the project, he claimed that Gisborne "could export power instead of importing it, give its industries cheaper electricity and do away with filthy rubbish dumps." Ultimately, Olivine abandoned its plans due to opposition from local residents and environmentalists including Environment Waikato, who claimed that the plant would pump toxins and greenhouse gases into the atmosphere. Jepson stated that Olivine would sue Environment Waikato for allegedly obstructing the resource consent process. 

Jepson settled in Mangawhai around 2002. He established a concrete business and was involved in rural and urban land development. Jepson was also involved in several local projects in Mangawhai including the construction of a  walking–cycle track.

Political career
In 2020, Jepson sponsored a petition in Northland calling for a local referendum on the Kaipara District Council's plans to introduce Māori wards and constituencies. 

During the 2022 New Zealand local elections, Jepson stood as a candidate for the Mayor of Kaipara on  the Democracy Northland local body ticket. On the economic front, he campaigned for a review of the Kaipara District Council's staffing levels and expenditure, repairing roads and infrastructure, and stopping "proliferate"  spending on so-called "feel-good" projects. Jepson also campaigned against the New Zealand Government's Three Waters reform programme, claiming that the four proposed water services entities would become "self-serving goliaths" that would waste ratepayers' money. In addition, Jepson opposed co-governance particularly the presence of Māori wards on local government bodies. 

On 7 October 2022, Jepson was elected mayor of Kaipara. In late October, Jepson appointed councillor Jonathan Larsen as deputy mayor.

2022 Karakia controversy
On 30 November 2022, Jepson attracted media attention after interrupting Māori ward councillor Pera Paniora's karakia (Māori prayer). In response, Race Relations Commissioner Meng Foon criticised Jepson's karakia ban from council proceedings, stating that it was very important for councils and all organisations to create the right space for Māori to honour the Treaty of Waitangi and to express their culture and language. Despite criticism, Jepson refused to back down and banned karakia from council meetings on 3 December on the grounds that specific religions or cultures should not be included in secular meetings.

On 8 December, Jepson and other members of the Kaipara District Council reached a compromise that would allow councillors to recite karakia, issue statements and reflections on a rotating basis. Paniora welcomed the compromise, stating that "it does mean that all the councillors feel included and comfortable and we are not forcing anything on them that they don't agree with." Meng Foon commended Jepson for backtracking on the ban and suggested that the local community needed to undergo a healing process. By that stage, a petition calling for Jepson to resign as mayor had attracted over 5,500 signatures.

On 14 December 300 people participated in a hīkoi (protest march) in Dargaville to protest Jepson's earlier decision to ban karakia. The hīkoi marched from Dargaville's town centre to the Kaipara District Council's meeting venue at he Northern Wairoa War Memorial Hall. The hīkoi was organised by Paturiri Toautu, who stood as a candidate for the council's new Te Moananui o Kaipara Māori ward during the 2022 local election. In response to the hīkoi, Jepson stated that he respected the participants' democratic rights to express their views but criticised Meng Foon and the Minister of Local Government, Nanaia Mahuta, for allegedly interfering in local community matters.

Views and positions

Climate change skepticism
Jepson has questioned the scientific consensus on climate change. In December 2022, he circulated copies of climate skeptic Bjørn Lomborg's book False Alarm – How climate change panic costs us trillions, hurts the poor and fails to fix the planet to fellow members of the Kaipara District Council.

Co-governance and race relations
Jepson has opposed the New Zealand Government's Three Waters reform programme and co-governance policies such as the Māori wards and constituencies.

References

1950s births
Year of birth missing (living people)
Living people
Mayors of places in the Northland Region
New Zealand businesspeople
21st-century New Zealand politicians